The Grodno State Agrarian University (GSAU) is one of four agricultural universities in Belarus, established in 1951 in Grodno. It employs over 760 staff including over 320 academic educators. The GSAU offers some 13 different fields of study, 7 faculties in Agricultural Sciences, Economic Sciences, Veterinary Medicine, Food Production.

History
On 17 January 1951, the university was founded consisted of Faculty of Agronomy and Faculty of Animal Science (Zootechnical)  and one of them was accommodated in Stanislavovo  a former summer residence of the last Polish king. In 1962 the Faculty of Plant Protection was founded. During the 90th the rapid growth of the university began because it was still the only one agricultural education establishment for Western part of Belarus.

Campus
The campus (more than 15 ha) is located mostly in the northern center of Grodno, very close to the district of Dzieviatovka.

Faculties

 Agronomical 
 Accountancy 
 Biotechnology 
 Economics
 Food Technology
 Faculty of Plant Protection 
 Veterinary Medicine 

Source:

Assets 

 Belarusian Public Association of Veterans
 Virtual Museum

Notable students and staff
 Alaksandar Iosifovich Dubko (1938-2001)  was the former chairman of the Hrodna Regional Executive Committee. In 1960 graduated from the Grodno State Agrarian University with a degree in agronomy. Have worked in different positions in agrarian sector, was a director of one of the biggest agricultural companies in Grodno region. In 1994, he was a candidate for President of Belarus.

References

Universities in Belarus